Haykeul Chikhaoui (born 4 September 1996) is a French-born Tunisian footballer who currently plays as a midfielder for Stade Tunisien.

Club career 

Chikhaoui is a youth exponent from FC Sochaux-Montbéliard. He made his Ligue 2 debut with FC Sochaux-Montbéliard at 29 August 2014 against Dijon FCO.

References

1996 births
Living people
Citizens of Tunisia through descent
Tunisian footballers
French footballers
French sportspeople of Tunisian descent
FC Sochaux-Montbéliard players
FC Porto B players
Varzim S.C. players
Stade Tunisien players
Liga Portugal 2 players
Ligue 2 players
Tunisian Ligue Professionnelle 1 players
Association football midfielders
Expatriate footballers in Portugal